Luke Digby (born 5 February 2001) is a British figure skater. He is 2021–22 British National champion in pair skating with Anastasia Vaipan-Law.

Biography 
Luke Digby was born in Sheffield on 5 February 2001. He began skating in 2007 at iceSheffield as a single skater.

Luke participated at 2017 European Youth Summer Olympic Festival, where he finished 8th. He became sixth at the Volvo Open Cup 2017. He competed at the 2017 Junior Nationals and became fifth.

Luke Digby won side-to-side Junior Nationals in 2018 and 2019. Nevertheless, his best international result was second place at the 2018 Torun Cup. He also finished 8th at the Minsk Arena Ice Star and 4th at the Volvo Open Cup. His only performance at the JGP in Egna was scored in 18th place. He also competed at two JGP in 2018, 12th in Slovakia and 11th in Lithuania.

Luke's last international ISU competition in single skating was the World Junior Championships. He finished in 43rd place with 40.37 points and did not advance to free skating.

Then he moved to pair skating. His first partner is Anastasia Vaipan-Law (born 1999) from Blackpool. Their coaches are Simon Briggs, Debi Briggs, and Jason Briggs.

In 2021 Anastasia and Luke won international The Tayside Trophy and finished fourth at the Trophee Metropole Nice Cote d’Azur (seniors). They appeared at two Challenger Trophy series: 17th at the Warsaw Cup and 12th at the Finlandia Trophy.

Anastasia and Luke won the National Championships in November 2021. Their score of 141.91 in total was higher by 0.51 point than four-time champions Zoe Jones and Christopher Boyadji.

Programs

With Vaipan-Law

Competitive highlights

Pairs with Vaipan-Law

References

External links 
 
 

British male single skaters
British male pair skaters
2001 births
Living people